Sir David Harrison  (born 3 May 1930) is a chemist and academic. He was vice chancellor of the University of Keele from 1979 to 1984, vice chancellor of the University of Exeter from 1984 to 1994, master of Selwyn College, Cambridge, from 1994 to 2000, and pro-vice chancellor of the University of Cambridge in 1997.

Harrison was educated at Bede School, Sunderland, Clacton County High School and Selwyn College, Cambridge, reading natural sciences (chemistry), before receiving a PhD in physical chemistry. He taught at Cambridge University until 1979, becoming a fellow of Selwyn and its senior tutor.

He was elected a Fellow of the Royal Academy of Engineering in 1987.

Outside academia, he was chairman of the Government's Advisory Committee on the safety of nuclear installations.

Harrison was knighted in 1997. In 1962 he married Sheila Rachel Debes and they had a son and daughter and one son deceased.

Harrison House and Harrison Way in Homerton College, University of Cambridge are named after Harrison.
The Harrison Building is named after him at Exeter University.
The SCR at Selwyn College is named the Harrison Room after him.

References

1930 births
Living people
People educated at Bede Grammar School for Boys
Vice-Chancellors of Keele University
Vice-Chancellors of the University of Exeter
Masters of Selwyn College, Cambridge
Fellows of Selwyn College, Cambridge
Alumni of Selwyn College, Cambridge
Fellows of the Royal Academy of Engineering
Commanders of the Order of the British Empire
Knights Bachelor